The following is a list of episodes of the PAX-TV drama Sue Thomas: F.B.Eye, which premiered on October 13, 2002, and cancelled on May 22, 2005.

A total of 57 episodes of the series have aired, including parts 1 and 2 of the pilot.

Series overview

Episodes

Season 1 (2002–03)

Season 2 (2003–04)

Season 3 (2004–05)

External links

Lists of American drama television series episodes